
Gmina Radomyśl Wielki is an urban-rural gmina (administrative district) in Mielec County, Subcarpathian Voivodeship, in south-eastern Poland.

Villages
Apart from the town of Radomyśl Wielki, Gmina Radomyśl Wielki contains the villages and settlements of Dąbie, Dąbrówka Wisłocka, Dulcza Mała, Dulcza Wielka, Janowiec, Partynia, Pień, Podborze, Ruda, Żarówka, Zdziarzec and Zgórsko.

Neighbouring gminas
Gmina Radomyśl Wielki is bordered by the gminas of Czarna, Mielec, Przecław, Radgoszcz, Wadowice Górne and Żyraków.

References
Polish official population figures 2006

Radomysl Wielki
Mielec County